Xenotilapia tenuidentata is a species of cichlid endemic to Lake Tanganyika where it is only known from the western shore (Democratic Republic of the Congo).  This species can reach a length of  TL.  It can also be found in the aquarium trade. Some authorities place this species in the genus Microdontochromis along with Xenotilapia rotundiventralis, with X. tenuidentata as the type species.

References

External links
 Photograph

tenuidentata
Fish of the Democratic Republic of the Congo
Endemic fauna of the Democratic Republic of the Congo
Cichlid fish of Africa
Fish of Lake Tanganyika
Fish described in 1951
Taxonomy articles created by Polbot